The Upapuranas are a genre of Hindu religious texts consisting of many compilations differentiated from the Mahapuranas by styling them as secondary Puranas using the prefix Upa (secondary). Though only a few of these compilations originated earlier than most of the extant Mahapuranas, some of these texts are extensive and important.

Definition and number 
Similar to the case of the Mahapuranas, a claim has been made in a number of Puranas and Smritis that the Upapuranas are also eighteen in number and give evidence of their knowledge of the existence of a larger number of the Upapuranas. But, unlike the case of the Mahapuranas, the different lists of eighteen Upapuranas seldom agree with one another with regard to the names of these texts. Lists of eighteen Upapuranas occur in a number of texts, which include the Kurma Purana, the Garuda Purana, the Brihaddharma Purana, the Sanat Kumara Purana, the Ekamra Purana, the Vāruṇa Purāṇa, the Pārāśara Purāṇa, the Skanda Purana, the Padma Purana, the Brahmavaivarta Purana, the Aushanasa Purāṇa, Hemadri's Caturvargacintamani and Ballal Sena's Dana Sagara. In spite of the mention of a particular Upapurana in different lists under different names, these lists provide us the names of much more than eighteen texts as the Upapuranas. In fact, by examining all the Sanskrit texts which mention the names of these texts, the actual number of the Upapuranas are found to be near a hundred, including those mentioned in the different lists. But, it can not be denied that many of these texts have been lost without leaving any trace.

Major Upapuranas

Sthala, Kula, and Minor Upapuranas 
Also called Aupapuranas or Atipuranas.

Sectarian divisions 
Unlike the Mahapuranas, most of the Upapuranas have been able to preserve their older materials along with their distinctive sectarian character. All extant Upapuranas can be broadly divided into six groups according to the sectarian views found in these texts: Vaishnava, Shakta, Shaiva, Saura, Ganapatya and non-sectarian.

Vaishnava Upapuranas 
The most significant texts among the Vaishnava Upapuranas are the Mānava Purana, the Vishnudharmottara Purana, the Narasimha Purana, the Brihannaradiya Purana and the Kriyayogasara.

The extant Narasimha Purana comprises 68 chapters. The extant Vishnudharma Purana comprises 105 chapters.

Shakta Upapuranas 
Among the Shakta Upapuranas, the most important extant texts are the Kalika Purana (or Sati Purana), the Mahabhagavata (Devi) Purana and the Candi Purana (or Candika Purana).

The extant Kalika Purana comprises 98 chapters.

Shaiva Upapuranas 
The notable Shaiva Upapuranas are the  Saura Purana, the Shivadharmapurva Purana, the Shivadharmottara Purana, the Shivarahasya Purana, the Ekamra Purana, the Parashara Purana, the Varuna Purana, and the Maheshwara Purana.

The extant Saura Purana comprises 69 chapters. The extant Parashara Upapurana consists 18 chapters. The extant Shivadharma Purana comprises 24 chapters and deals only with the religious rites and duties of the worshippers of Shiva. It mentions itself as a shastra or dharmashastra.

 Saura Upapuranas 
The only extant text which can be called an exclusive Saura Purana is the Samba Purana. It comprises 84 chapters.

 Ganapatya Upapuranas 
Only two extant Upapuranas profess the views of the Ganapatya sect. These are the Mudgala Purana and the Ganesha Purana.

 Non-sectarian Upapuranas 
The Upapuranic works, which do not profess any particular sectarian views are the Bhavishyottara Purana, the Kapila Purana and the Brihaddharma Purana.

 Scholarship 

Dr. R. C. Hazra's magnum opus for which he earned a D. Litt was a detailed catalogue of contents, comparison of manuscripts of Upapuranas; popularly known as Studies in the Upapurāṇas''. It was series of five volumes of equal length, a part of the Calcutta Sanskrit College Research Series (out of which only two were published by Munshiram Manoharlal, both generally edited by Gaurinath Sastri and Hazra's handwritten papers of the other three volumes are kept with the College); on a descriptive study of all more than hundred Upapuranas, which, even to this day, remains an important but ignored field of Sanskrit literature.

References 

Hindu texts
Puranas